Mawalan Marika (1908–1967), often referred to as Mawalan 1 Marika to distinguish from Mawalan 2 Marika, was an Aboriginal Australian artist and the leader of the Rirratjingu clan of the Yolngu people of north-east Arnhem Land, in the Northern Territory of Australia. He is known for his bark paintings, carvings and political activism.

Biography 
Mawalan Marika was born around 1908 in Yirrkala. His name derives from the mawalan, or digging stick used by the Djang'kawu of the creation story of the Rirratjingu clan. His clan falls under the Dhuwa moiety, one of the two moieties found in Arnhem Land.

In addition to being an important asset to many anthropologists, including Charles P. Mountford and Ronald Berndt, he was one of the most prominent political activists of his time. Mawalan and his four brothers led the other clans in presenting the Yirrkala bark petitions to the Australian Government in 1963, in the lead-up to the 1971 Gove land rights case (aka Milirrpum v Nabalco Pty Ltd, named after his brother Milirrpum).

Marika was one of the first artists to break from tradition and teach his daughters (i.e. women) how to paint the sacred madayin clan designs. Marika advocated for the teaching of Yolŋu culture to the general Australian population, and negotiated the foundation of a Methodist mission at Yirrkala in 1935. One way he tried to encourage this transmission of knowledge was the establishment of commercial production of bark paintings through the mission.

Career 
Marika painted over 40 works, many of which can be found in art collections of museums or private collectors. In the 1950s, he helped to create a commercial bark painting environment at the Yirrkala mission and collaborated in the creation of the Yirrkala Church Panels in 1963. One of Marika's figurative traits is that he often paints the Djang'kawu sisters, who are said to be the creator beings of the Dhuwa moiety. The Marika family see themselves as direct descendants of the Djang'kawu. Mawalan created an entire series of paintings detailing the journey on the Djang'kawu sisters into country. A collection of Marika's bark paintings entitled Djan'kawu story (1959) is held by the Art Gallery of New South Wales.

As well as being known for his bark paintings, Marika had a high level of skill in carving and sculpture. His sculptures are cleanly painted with clan designs and finished with feathers, human hair, or other such natural attachments.

His style is characteristic of the Dhuwa moiety, featuring many dots, diagonal lines, and geometric/diamond shapes. One of the innovations for which Marika is credited is the use of episodic or panel style bark paintings and breaking away from the use of rarrk by using dotting techniques and more figural elements. A notable trait of many of his paintings is the striking use of yellow ochre, which features heavily in all his works, sculptural and painted. Many of his works deal with subjects relating to the sacred stories and ceremonies of the clan.

Collections 

 Art Gallery of New South Wales, Sydney
 National Gallery of Australia, Canberra
 National Gallery of Victoria, Melbourne

Significant exhibitions 

 Old Masters Exhibition - National Gallery of Australia
 The Art of Arnhem Land - Perth, 1957
 Dreamings - New York, 1988
 Aratjara - Europe, 199394
 Yalangbara: Art of the Djang'kawu - National Museum of Australia, 201011

References

Further reading 

 
 
 Short bios of: Mawalan Marika 1 (c. 1908–1967), Mathaman Marika (c. 1920–1970), Milirrpum Marika (c. 1923–1983), Roy Dadaynga Marika MBE (c. 1925–1993), Wandjuk Djuwakan Marika OBE (1929–1987), Banduk Marika (born 1954), Dhuwarrwarr Marika (born c.1946), Wanyubi Marika (born 1967), Yalmay Gurrwun (Marika) Yunupingu (born 1956),  Mawalan Marika 2 (born 1957), Jimmy Barrmula Yunupingu (born 1963) (son of Dhuwarrwarr Marika).
 

Australian Aboriginal artists
1900s births
1967 deaths
20th-century Australian artists
Artists from the Northern Territory